Lo-Tel was a pop rock band based in Sydney, Australia. They achieved commercial success and are best known for their single "Teenager of the Year" released 2000. They no longer perform as Lo-Tel; however, two past members continue to produce music.

History
In 1998, Lo-Tel were initially a trio of Luke Hanigan (singer and guitarist), Dave Lumsdaine (bass), and Darren Brollo (drums), recording tracks in Hanigan's home studio. This led to their first shows, and, with the help of John O'Donnell, they were signed to Epic Records in 1999. Hanigan said, "It was almost like we tripped and wound up with a record contract; it was so ridiculously speedy." In April 1999, Lo-Tel recorded their debut album Planet of the Stereos. Hanigan said, "We spent five weeks making it, and then six months getting it remixed by various Americans."

Their first single, "Genre Casting", was released in early 2000 on vinyl only. "Teenager of the Year" was released in May 2000 and became a Top 40 hit on the back of its appearance in the popular Australian film Looking for Alibrandi. Marty Hailey joined the band in May 2000 on 2nd guitar, keyboards, and backing vocals. Planet of the Stereos was eventually released in October 2000 and achieved moderate commercial success. Two further singles from the album, "A Pop Song Saved My Life" and "Crucifix", enjoyed a similar amount of airplay and publicity but were less successful. In March 2001, Luke Hanigan married his longtime partner, Australian actor Pia Miranda, in Las Vegas.

After a two-year break, Lo-Tel regrouped in 2002 (with Paul Wheeler replacing Brollo) and released their second album, The Lost Thing, in August 2003, with artwork by Shaun Tan. Although the album track, "Angel", received widespread commercial airplay, The Lost Thing failed to make the Top 100. The band split in 2003.

Luke Hanigan continues to write music under a solo title. David Lumsdaine has had commercial success as a production music composer. Darren Brollo is the drummer of State of Grace.

Discography

Albums

Singles

Awards and nominations

ARIA Music Awards 
The ARIA Music Awards are an annual series presented by Australian Recording Industry Association (ARIA) since 1987, which recognise excellence, innovation, and achievement across all genres of Australian music.

|-
| 2000
| "Teenager of the Year"
| ARIA Award for Breakthrough Artist – Single
| 
|-
| 2001
| Planet of the Stereos
| ARIA Award for Breakthrough Artist – Album
| 
|-

References

External links
Band profile on Australian Music Online
Rage website featuring Planet of the Stereos-era bio

Australian pop rock groups
Australian alternative metal musical groups
Australian post-grunge groups
Musical groups established in 1998
Musical groups disestablished in 2003